Zipang is a twenty-six episode Japanese anime television series directed by Kazuhiro Furuhashi and produced by Studio Deen. It aired on the Tokyo Broadcasting System in Japan between October 7, 2004 and March 31, 2005, and was licensed for release in North America by Geneon Entertainment with DVD release starting in September 2006. It was adapted from the manga of the same name by Kaiji Kawaguchi.

Episode list

DVD release
Zipang was licensed for release in North America by Geneon Entertainment with DVD release starting in September 2006.
 Screen Ratio:  Widescreen 1.85:1 Color (Anamorphic)
 Layers:  Single Side, Single Layer
 Release Date:  9/5/2006
 Subtitles:  English
 Packaging:  Keep case
 Audio Tracks:  ENGLISH: Dolby Digital Stereo and JAPANESE: Dolby Digital Stereo

Zipang